Rickshaw Sightseeing Bus (Chinese: 人力車觀光巴士) is a brand of sightseeing transportation service operated by New World First Bus Services Limited (NWFB), one of the franchised bus services operators in Hong Kong. Using "rickshaw", an old Hong Kong icon, as a trademark, it offers a thematic sightseeing route by open-top sightseeing buses decorated under the rickshaw concept. It aims to facilitate visitors to explore local culture and diverse attractions of Hong Kong.

The Rickshaw Sightseeing Bus was introduced on 18 October 2009, intended to reminisce the early days of Hong Kong for visitors and local citizens, and also to facilitate the up-growing demand of individual travelers. Before 13 December 2014, there were two routes which called "H1 Heritage Tour" and "H2 Metropolis Tour", but it merged into a route with the new crossing-harbour trip.

Routes

Rickshaw Sightseeing Bus provides a sightseeing route, "H1 Heritage Tour."

H1 Heritage Tour
The "H1 Heritage Tour" takes riders around key attractions in Hong Kong Island and Kowloon.

En route bus stops
Fare: $33.0 HKD/ direction (From Stop 1 to 21 and Stop 21 to 1)
1. Central (Star Ferry)
 Stops from No. 2 to 11 are the additional stop of daytime departure (Depart from Star Ferry 10:00-16:30)
2. Central (Exchange Square) Bus Terminus - Interchange stop for Citybus route 260 to Stanley, New World First Bus route 15 to The Peak
3. Connaught Road West near Western Market, Macau Ferry Terminal
4. Queen Street near Ginseng & Bird's Nest Street
5. Hollywood Road opposite Man Mo Temple, Lascar Row
6. Peel Street
7. Hollywood Road opposite Old Central Police Station
8. Lan Kwai Fong, Wyndham Street
9. Ladder Street, Duddell Street gas lamps
10. Statue Square (Chater Road)
11. Central Government Offices, Tamar Park
12. The Monument In Commemoration Of The Return Of Hong Kong To China
13. Golden Bauhinia Square, Convention and Exhibition Centre
14. Wna Chai Ferry Pier

Across Cross-Harbour Tunnel to Kowloon

15. Temple Street
16. Jade Street, Battery Street
17. Harbour City
18. 1881 Heritage, Peking Road
19. Avenue Of Stars, East Tsim Sha Tsui station (Change For MTR West Rail line)
20. K11
21. Hong Kong Museum of History, Granville Road

Passengers who would like to continue their journey to stops no 22 to 1, should pay $33 HKD again when alighting
Across Cross-Harbour Tunnel to Hong Kong Island

22. Causeway Bay Shopping Area, Paterson Street
23. Times Square, Lee Gardens
24. Happy Valley Racecourse
25. Bowing Road Market (Ngo Keng Kiu)
26. Southorn Playground, Wo Cheong Pawn Shop
27. Pacific Place, Hong Kong Park
28. Peak Tram Terminus, St John's Cathedral
29. Statue Square (Connaught Road Central)
1. Central (Star Ferry)

Starting from 13 December 2014, routes H1 and H2 combined to form a new route. This new route contained an extension to Kowloon while also cancelling stops in the Mid-Levels. The route departs every 30 minutes from 10:00 am till 8:30 pm every day.

Fleet

 Three 1998 11-metre Volvo Olympian with Walter Alexander R-type body (Open-topped, fleet number VA52-VA53, VA55)
 Five 2002 12-metre Dennis Trident with Alexander ALX500 body (Open-topped, fleet number 1215-1219)

Starting from February 2015, a batch of five 2002 Dennis Trident 12-metre (fleet number 1215-1219) were converted into half open-topped sightseeing bus and replace the 11-metre Volvo Olympians. The old Olympians will start to transfer to Citybus and replace the old open-topped Leyland Olympians. VA51 had its last day service on Route H1 on 15 April 2015 while the replacement Tridents were not ready for service until 16 May 2015. During this period, New World First Bus Services Limited (NWFB) were using standard buses including Dennis Tridents (fleet number 1180 and 3313) and Alexander Dennis Enviro500s (fleet number 4040 which had been repainted into Arts Bus on the Move 2015 livery, 5518 and 5539 which are in standard livery and 5568 which had been repainted into 2015 Year of The Goat Chinese Zodiac Bus livery). The first half open-topped Trident, 1215, finally entered service on 16 May 2015 operating on the first departure that day. The second and the third new open-topped buses entered service on 19 May 2015 and 20 June 2015. The second Olympian to be transferred to Citybus was VA54 and its last day service was 17 May 2015 and it was repainted into red 'Auntie Nora' livery to replace the AEC Routemaster open-topped vintage bus in the Citybus fleet. VA51 and VA54 changed their fleet numbers into 22 and 23 and finally joined Citybus in June 2015.

Fare
Single trip fare: HKD 33 (Riders are required to alight at stop 21 of one single trip fare, or continue to stay on the bus to continue the journey, it's required to pay the single trip fare again when alighting )
One-day Pass: HKD 200 (One day unlimited hop-on hop-off rides on route H1)

Service hours and headways
 H1 Heritage Tour Daytime Tour (Stops 1-29)
Departures from Central Star Ferry Pier: 10:00 – 16:30 (Every 30 minutes)
 H1 Heritage Tour Nighttime Tour (Stops 1,11-29)
Departures from Central Star Ferry Pier: 17:00 – 20:30 (Every 30 minutes)

See also
Big Bus Tours - competitor

References

External links

Rickshaw Sightseeing Bus
New World First Bus Services Limited

Bus transport in Hong Kong
Tourism in Hong Kong